Through the Darkness may refer to:

 Through the Darkness (album), a 1999 studio album by D Generation
 Through the Darkness (novel), a 2001 novel by Harry Turtledove
 Through the Darkness (TV series), a 2022 South Korean television series

See also
 Through the Dark (disambiguation)